Division No. 4, Subd. E is an unorganized subdivision on the Port au Port Peninsula on the island of Newfoundland in Newfoundland and Labrador, Canada. It is in Division No. 4.
According to the 2016 Statistics Canada Census:
Population: 1,957
% Change (2011 to 2016): -0.8
Dwellings: 1,027
Area: 298.11 km2
Density: 6.6 people/km2

Division No. 4, Subd. E includes the unincorporated communities of
Boswarlos
 Felix Cove

References

Newfoundland and Labrador subdivisions